"I Don't Wanna Dance"  is a song by Italian DJ Alex Gaudino, taken from his second studio album Doctor Love (2013). The song was released from 3 September 2012 by Ultra Records. The song was written by Taio Cruz, Alfonso Fortunato Gaudino, Giuseppe D'Albenzio and Jamie Luis Gomez. The song features vocals from American singer, actor, and rapper Taboo. The song features samples from "Can You Feel It" by The Jackson 5.

Music video
A music video to accompany the release of "I Don't Wanna Dance" was first released onto YouTube on 16 August 2012 at a total length of three minutes and nine seconds.

Track listing

Charts

Weekly charts

Year-end charts

Release history

References

2012 singles
Songs written by Taio Cruz
2012 songs
Songs written by Alex Gaudino
Ultra Music singles
Alex Gaudino songs